This is a list of awards and nominations received by American film director, producer, screenwriter, comedian and actor Adam McKay.

Major associations

Academy Awards

BAFTA Film Awards

Golden Globe Awards

Primetime Emmy Awards

Guilds

Directors Guild of America Awards

Writers Guild of America Awards

Other awards and nominations

AACTA Awards

Alliance of Women Film Journalists

Austin Film Critics Association

Chicago Film Critics Association

Critics' Choice Movie Awards

Dallas–Fort Worth Film Critics Association

Detroit Film Critics Society

Empire Awards

Golden Raspberry Awards

USC Scripter Awards

St. Louis Film Critics Association

Toronto Film Critics Association

References

External links
 

McKay, Adam